The 2018 COSAFA Women's Championship was an international football tournament for national teams organised by COSAFA, teams from Southern Africa. It took place from 12 to 22 September in the Nelson Mandela Bay Metropolitan Municipality, South Africa.

Participants
Twelve teams take part in the competition, 10 of the 14 COSAFA members and also Uganda and Cameroon as invited guest nations. The draw was held on 29 August.

 (invite)

 (invite)

Venues

Group stage
The group stage is composed of three groups of four teams each. Group winners and the best runner-up amongst all groups advance to the semi-finals.
 All times are South African Standard Time (UTC+2).

Group A

Group B

Group C

Knockout stage

Semi-finals

Bronze medal match

Final

Statistics

Goalscorers

Awards
The winners of the tournament awards were:
 Player of the Tournament –  Genevieve Ngo Mbeleck
 Goalkeeper of the Tournament –  Ruth Atoru
 Golden Boot –  Linda Motlhalo (4 goals)
 Fair Play award –

References

External links
Official website

2018
2018 in African football
2018–19 in South African soccer
2018 in South African women's sport
2018 in women's association football
International association football competitions hosted by South Africa